Ephedra altissima is a species of Ephedra that is native to the western Sahara (Morocco, Algeria, Tunisia, Libya, Chad, Mauritania), and also to the Canary Islands.

The species is cultivated as an ornamental plant and medicinal plant.

Habitat 
This plant is located in Algeria, Chad, Libya, Mauritania, Morocco, Spain, Tunisia, and the western Sahara. It can be viewed at elevations between 10 meters to 700 meters above sea level.

Characteristics 
This plant is described as a green, dioecious shrub. Each flower is either male or female needing two different for seed formation. It prefers well drained, loamy soil in an area with direct sunlight. Once established the plant is hardy,  resistant to drought and lime.
The leaves bud in an opposite fashion with the plant being green all year. A shrub often found on rocky calcareous slopes. Flowering time is between February–May. Fruiting time is between April–May. The ripe female cone is eaten by animals.

Taxonomy
It was originally described by René Louiche Desfontaines in 1799 and placed in section Pseudobaccatae (=sect. Ephedra), "tribe" Scandentes. This being due to the similarity in stem and leaf structure and organization.

In 1996 Robert A. Price classified E. altissima in section Ephedra without recognizing a tribe.

Threat 
As a result of the plant having such a widespread location, there are no specific major threats. This plant was last assessed by IUCN on August 13, 2010, with a least concerned rating. Due to the non-concerned attitude toward the endangerment of the species, no seeds have been collected as an ex situ conservation measure. It is not known to occur in any protected areas.

Medicinal uses 
The members of this genus have alkaloid ephedrine which are integral in the treatment of asthma and other related respiratory issues. By using the entire plant and not just the stem it has been observed, as compared to isolated ephedrine, to have few side effects. This is used to treat symptoms not cure respiratory issues. Young plants have the best potency if ingested raw while older plants are best to be dried and used in a tea.

Varieties
Ephedra altissima var. altissima - Morocco, Algeria, Tunisia, Libya, Mauritania, Canary Islands
Ephedra altissima var. tibestica Maire - Tibesti Mountains of northern Chad

References

External links

PFAF Plant Database — Ephedra altissima

altissima
Flora of the Canary Islands
Flora of North Africa
Plants described in 1799
Garden plants of Africa
Tibesti Mountains
Taxa named by René Louiche Desfontaines